The Serbia men's national under-16 basketball team is the boys' basketball team, administered by Basketball Federation of Serbia, that represents Serbia in international under-16 (under age 16) men's basketball competitions, consisting mainly of the FIBA Europe Under-16 Championship. The event was originally referred to as the FIBA Europe Championship for Cadets.

The national team played as FR Yugoslavia from 1993 to 2003, and as Serbia and Montenegro from 2004 to 2006.

History

1992–2006: Serbia and Montenegro

2007 onwards: Serbia

Individual awards 

 Most Valuable Player
 Aleksandar Gajić – 1999
 Veljko Tomović – 2001
 Nemanja Aleksandrov – 2003
 Dejan Musli – 2007
 Stefan Peno – 2013
 All-Tournament Team
 Nikola Janković – 2010
 Stefan Peno – 2013
 Miloš Glišić – 2013
 Marko Pecarski – 2016
 Đorđe Pažin – 2017

 Statistical leaders: Points
 Marko Pecarski – 2016
 Statistical leaders: Assists
 Stevan Karapandžić – 2017
 Statistical leaders: Rebounds
 Marko Pecarski – 2016

European Championship competitive record

Representing FR Yugoslavia / Serbia and Montenegro

Representing Serbia

Coaches

FR Yugoslavia / Serbia and Montenegro

Serbia

Past rosters

Representing FY Yugoslavia / Serbia and Montenegro

Representing Serbia

See also 
 Serbian men's university basketball team
 Serbia men's national under-20 basketball team
 Serbia men's national under-19 basketball team
 Serbia men's national under-18 basketball team
 Serbia men's national under-17 basketball team

References

Notes

External links
 Basketball Federation of Serbia
 History at FIBA Europe

M U16
Men's national under-16 basketball teams